Black Edge is a summit,  high, on a sharp ridgeline above the village of Dove Holes in the Dark Peak area of the Peak District in the county of Derbyshire in England.

Geography

Location 
It lies in open moorland on the gritstone crest of the eponymous escarpment that runs roughly north to south. There are alternative summits at SK062771 and SK060763. In addition the ground 130 metres to the north and the ruined building 650 metres south-southeast are at the same height as the summit.

Surrounding area 
Nine hundred metres further north, also on the crest, is Hob Tor. Here the escarpment swings northwest, while a short spur, on which there is a tumulus known as Lady Low, heads northeast. To the west of Black Edge the heather-clad terrain of Combs Moss descends initially slowly for about a kilometre before dropping steeply into the valley south of Combs Reservoir. To the east of Black Edge, the escarpment dives into the lowlands north of Buxton. A railway line hugs the foot of the scarp slope and is paralleled to the east by the A6.

References 

Mountains and hills of the Peak District
Mountains and hills of Derbyshire